Hannah Yeoh Tseow Suan (born 9 January 1979) is a Malaysian politician who has served as the Minister of Youth and Sports in the Pakatan Harapan (PH) administration under Prime Minister Anwar Ibrahim since December 2022. Previously, she served as the Deputy Minister of Women, Family and Community Development in the Pakatan Harapan (PH) administration under former Prime Minister Mahathir Mohamad and former Minister Wan Azizah Wan Ismail from July 2018 to the collapse of the PH administration in February 2020. She has served as the Member of Parliament (MP) for Segambut since May 2018. She also served as 10th Speaker of the Selangor State Legislative Assembly from June 2013 to April 2018 and Member of the Selangor State Legislative Assembly (MLA) for Subang Jaya from March 2008 to May 2018. She is a member of the Democratic Action Party (DAP), a component party of the PH-led Unity Government coalition. She has served as the Assistant National Publicity Secretary of DAP since March 2022.

Background
Born in Subang Jaya, Yeoh studied at SK Sri Subang Jaya, SRK SS19 and SMK Subang Utama, after which she continued her studies at the University of Tasmania in Australia and obtained her law degree in 2001. She was recognized as a lawyer by the Malaysian Bar in January 2003 and was subsequently admitted to the Supreme Court of Tasmania after obtaining a Certificate of Legal Practice in Tasmania. Yeoh then served as a lawyer in Petaling Jaya for three years before moving to the ceremony management company in 2006.

Political career
Driven by Edward Ling, her schoolmate, to join the world of politics, both Yeoh and Ling joined the Damansara Democratic Action Party (DAP) Branch in the late 2006. Yeoh opted to join the DAP even though the party was an opposition party as she felt that the stand of the political party is the most consistent, though its leaders are often threatened by the Internal Security Act which allows for arrest and imprisonment without any trial.

Inspired by Tony Pua, Damansara Branch Chairman, who resigned to join DAP full-time, Yeoh followed Pua's footsteps and resigned shortly before the March 2008 general election to become a full-time politician.

Yeoh was elected as the Selangor state assemblyperson for the seat of Subang Jaya in the 2008 general election. In the 2013 general election, Yeoh was re-elected as Subang Jaya state assembly person for the second term. After her re-election, on 21 June 2013 she was sworn in as Malaysia's first woman speaker for Selangor State Assembly. At the age of 34 she was also the youngest speaker of any legislative Assembly in Malaysia.

In the 2018 general election, Yeoh was picked by DAP to run for the Segambut parliamentary seat and won. When Pakatan Harapan took over the government, she was appointed as the Deputy Minister of Women, Family, and Community Development in the new Malaysian cabinet.

Personal life
Yeoh has 4 siblings. She is a former lawyer and event manager. She is married to Ramachandran Muniandy with whom she has two daughters, Shay Adora Ram and Kayleigh Imani Ram.

Election results

See also
 Segambut (federal constituency)
 Subang Jaya (state constituency)

Notes and references

External links
 

21st-century Malaysian lawyers
1979 births
Women in Kuala Lumpur politics
Living people
Democratic Action Party (Malaysia) politicians
Women members of the Dewan Rakyat
Members of the Dewan Rakyat
Members of the 15th Malaysian Parliament
Women MLAs in Selangor
Malaysian Christians
Malaysian politicians of Chinese descent
University of Tasmania alumni
Members of the Selangor State Legislative Assembly
Speakers of the Selangor State Legislative Assembly
Malaysian women lawyers
Women legislative speakers
21st-century Malaysian women politicians
21st-century Malaysian politicians